Gatehouse of Fleet railway station served the town of Gatehouse of Fleet, Dumfries and Galloway, Scotland from 1861 to 1965 on the Portpatrick and Wigtownshire Joint Railway. The station was over 6 miles from the town.

History 
The station opened in September 1861 as Dromore by the Portpatrick and Wigtownshire Joint Railway. It went through a lot of name changes, being renamed to Gatehouse on 1 July 1863, to Dromore for Gatehouse on 1 June 1865, back to Gatehouse on 2 September 1866, back to Dromore on 1 June 1871, and finally to Gatehouse of Fleet on 1 January 1912. The station closed to passengers on 5 December 1949 but reopened on 20 May 1950, only to close along with the line on 14 June 1965.

References

External links 

Disused railway stations in Dumfries and Galloway
Former Portpatrick and Wigtownshire Joint Railway stations
Railway stations in Great Britain opened in 1861
Railway stations in Great Britain closed in 1949
Railway stations in Great Britain opened in 1950
Railway stations in Great Britain closed in 1965
Beeching closures in Scotland
1861 establishments in Scotland
1965 disestablishments in Scotland
Gatehouse of Fleet